Count Robert du Mesnil du Buisson (9 April 1895, Champobert, Bourges – 8 April 1986, Caen) was a French historian, soldier, and archeologist. He was noted for his early use of geophysical survey for archaeology. He was son of Auguste, comte du Mesnil du Buisson and Berthe Roussel de Courcy, and married Jeanne Leclerc de Pulligny on 26 June 1923.

Soldier
Mesnil du Buisson volunteered in 1914, before the call-up, and was lieutenant in the 6th Regiment of chasseurs à cheval. He was awarded chevalier de la Légion d'Honneur for bravery. He volunteered again in 1939, as commander of a squadron of the cavalerie de réserve, fighting in Belgium and France in 1940 then joining the resistance in Normandy. He was elevated to commandeur de la Légion d'Honneur and commandeur de l’ordre des Arts et des Lettres. His other medals included the croix de guerre 1914-1918 and 1939-1945, croix du combattant volontaire, with medals of Verdun, of Syria and of the Resistance.

Archeologist
He was director of excavations at Qatna (el-Mishrifeh: 1924, 1927–29), Til-Barsip (Tell el-Ahmar: 1927, 1929–31), Hadatu (Arslan Tash, 1928), and was vice-director of excavations at Dura-Europos from 1932 to 1937 coordinated between Yale University led by Clark Hopkins and the French Académie des inscriptions et belles-lettres. He discovered the Synagogue of Dura Europos and published on the synagogue's frescos in 1939. Among his other archeological finds were the Baalshamin and the Arslan Tash amulets.

Conservation work

From 1969 he became actively involved in work to preserve the Le manoir d'Argentelles at Villebadin. He died of injuries sustained in a car accident in 1986.

Publications
 La Technique des fouilles archéologiques. Les principes généraux, Paris, 1934
 La Basilique chrétienne du quartier Karm el-Arabis à Homs, Beirut, 1930
 Le Site archéologique de Mishrifé-Qatna, Paris, 1935
 Les Noms et signes égyptiens désignant des vases ou objets similaire, Paris, 1936
 Les peintures de la Synagogue de Doura-Europos, 245-246 après J.-C., Rome, 1939
 Le sautoir d'Atargatis et la chaîne d'amulettes 1947
 Le Manoir d'Argentelles : Sauvetage d'une œuvre d'art en péril, éd. Gallier, 1969
 Etudes sur les dieux phéniciens hérités par l'Empire romain 1970
 Nouvelles études sur les dieux et les mythes de Canaan 1973

References

1895 births
1986 deaths
French soldiers
French archaeologists
French military personnel of World War I
French male non-fiction writers
20th-century French historians
20th-century archaeologists
20th-century French male writers